Assiminea mesopotamica is a species of minute, salt-tolerant snail with an operculum, an aquatic gastropod molluscs, or micromolluscs, in the family Assimineidae.

Distribution and habitat
This species is endemic to the Shatt al-Arab in Iraq. It is found amongst submerged vegetation in slow-flowing waters close to coastal regions, and is tolerant of brackish waters.

References

Assimineidae
Endemic fauna of Iraq
Gastropods described in 2007